118P/Shoemaker–Levy (also known as periodic comet Shoemaker–Levy 4) is a comet discovered by astronomers Carolyn and Eugene M. Shoemaker and David Levy.

During the 2010 apparition the comet became as bright as apparent magnitude 11.5.

The comet nucleus is estimated to be 4.8 kilometers in diameter.

On December 3, 2015, comet Shoemaker–Levy 4 will pass  from asteroid 4 Vesta.

This comet should not be confused with Comet Shoemaker–Levy 9 (D/1993 F2) which spectacularly crashed into Jupiter in 1994.

References

External links 
 Orbital simulation from JPL (Java) / Horizons Ephemeris
 118P magnitude plot for 2010
 http://jcometobs.web.fc2.com/pcmtn/0118p.htm
 118P on Kronk's Cometography

Periodic comets
0118
Discoveries by Carolyn S. Shoemaker
Discoveries by Eugene Merle Shoemaker
118P Shoemaker-Levy
Comets in 2016
19910209